Capricorn Coast is a national park in the Shire of Livingstone, Queensland, Australia.

Geography 
The park is 535 km northwest of Brisbane.

It covers about 114 hectares, and is divided into five sections: Vallis Park, Rosslyn Head, Double Head, Bluff Point, and Pinnacle Point. The five sections were amalgamated into a single national park in 1994. The average elevation of the terrain is 34 meters.

Wildlife 
The park is home to 402 different species of animals, of which 24 species are rare or endangered.

See also

 Protected areas of Queensland

References

National parks of Central Queensland
Protected areas established in 1992